St. Landry Parish is a parish located in the U.S. state of Louisiana. As of the 2020 Census, the population was 82,540.  The parish seat is Opelousas. The parish was established in 1807.

St. Landry Parish comprises the Opelousas, LA Micropolitan Statistical Area (μSA), which is also included in the Lafayette-Opelousas-Morgan City, LA Combined Statistical Area. It is at the heart of Creole and Cajun culture and heritage in Louisiana.

History

French and Spanish Territory
The land that became St. Landry Parish was inhabited since at least 10,500 B.C., as deduced from excavations of three prehistoric dwelling sites. By the 15th century, the Opelousa Indians settled in the area situated between Atchafalaya River and Sabine River (at the border of Texas-Louisiana). The Opelousa were war-like and preyed on neighbors to defend their own territory.

The first European recorded in the Opelousa territory was a French trader named Michel de Birotte. He came in 1690 and negotiated with the Opelousa nation. Nine years later, France named Louisiana as a colony and defined the land occupied by the Opelousa as the Opelousas Territory. The area south of the Opelousas Territory between the Atchafalaya River, the Gulf of Mexico and Bayou Nezpique, occupied by the Attakapas Indians (Eastern Atakapa), was named Attakapas Territory.

In 1764, France established the Opelousas Post slightly north of the contemporary city of Opelousas (near present-day Washington). It was a major trading organization for the developing area.  In addition, France established the Attakapas Post (near the present-day St. Martinville) in the Attakapas Territory, in 1765.  France gave land grants to soldiers and settlers to encourage development. Most settlers were French immigrants. Tradition says that Jean Joseph LeKintrek and Joseph Blainpain, who had formed a partnership to trade with the Opelousa Indians, came in the early 1740s. They brought three enslaved Africans, the first to live in the area.

Some Indians sold land to the newcomers. When the Eastern Attakapas Chief Kinemo sold all the land between Vermilion River and Bayou Teche to Frenchman Gabriel Fuselier de la Claire in 1760, however, the angry Opelousa tribe exterminated the Attakapas (Eastern Atakapa).

France ceded Louisiana and its territories to Spain in 1762. Under Spanish rule, Opelousas Post became the center of government for Southwest Louisiana. By 1769 about 100 families were living in Opelousas Post. Between 1780 and 1820, the first settlers were joined by others coming from the Attakapas Territory, from the Pointe Coupée Territory, and east from the Atchafalaya River area.  They were joined by immigrants from the French West Indies, who left after Haiti/St. Domingue became independent in a slave revolution. Most of the new settlers were French, Spaniards, French Creoles, Spanish Creoles, Africans and African-Americans.

The group from Attakapas Post included many Acadians. These were French who migrated from Nova Scotia in 1763, after their expulsion by the English in the aftermath of France's defeat in the Seven Years' War (known in North America as the French and Indian War). They were led by Jean-Jacques Blaise d'Abbadie. D'Abbadie was Governor of the territory from 1763 to 1765. The French community built St. Landry Catholic Church in 1765, dedicated to St. Landry (Landericus) of Paris, the Bishop of Paris in the 7th century.

On April 10, 1805, after the United States had acquired the Louisiana Purchase, the post was named the town of Opelousas and became the seat of the County of Opelousas, part of the Territory of Orleans. In 1807, when the territory was reorganized into parishes, Opelousas was designated the seat of St. Landry Parish.

Purchase by the United States

The United States gained control of the territory in 1803 through the Louisiana Purchase.  Americans from the South and other parts of the United States began to migrate to the area, marking the arrival of the first large English-speaking population and the introduction of the need for more general use of English.

St. Landry Parish was officially established on April 10, 1805 by a legislative act, becoming the largest parish in the Louisiana state.  The new parish was named after the St. Landry Catholic Church located near the Opelousas Post.  The parish's boundaries encompassed about half the land of the Opelousas Territory, between the Atchafalaya River and Sabine River, between Rapides Parish and Vernon Parish,  and Lafayette and St. Martin Parishes.  Since then, the area of the parish has decreased, as six additional parishes have been created from its territory.  These include Calcasieu, Acadia, Evangeline, Jeff Davis, Beauregard, and Allen.

In 1821 the second educational institution west of the Mississippi was founded in Grand Coteau.  In this community south of Opelousas is the Academy of the Sacred Heart, a private Catholic school founded by the French Creole community.

The city of Opelousas has been the seat of government for the St. Landry Parish since its formation.  After Baton Rouge fell to the Union troops during the Civil War in 1862, Opelousas became the state capital for nine months.  The capital was moved again in 1863, this time to Shreveport when Union troops occupied Opelousas.

St. Landry Parish originally consisted of all the territory in the current parishes of Acadia, Evangeline, and St. Landry.  Over time, it was separated into three different parishes.  The southwestern portion of St. Landry was broken off to become Acadia Parish in 1886.  A bill was introduced in the Louisiana House of Representatives entitled "An act to create the parish of Nicholls, and to provide for the organization thereof." The title was later changed to read: "An act to create the parish of Acadia." Father Joseph Anthonioz, the first pastor of the Catholic Church at Rayne, is credited with having suggested the name, Acadia Parish. The bill passed the house on June 11, the senate on June 28, and was approved by Governor Samuel D. McEnery on June 30. On October 6, an election was held to affirm the creation of the parish, with 2,516 votes for and 1,521 votes against the creation.

St. Landry  was divided again when the northwestern portion was broken away.  In June 1908, a bill was passed to create a new parish out of a portion of St. Landry Parish.  This new parish became named Evangeline Parish in 1910.  Prior to creation of the new parish, Eunice and Ville Platte were in competition for the new parish seat.  Ville Platte was selected by voters on April 12, 1909. After the election, Eunice declared it would remain in St. Landry Parish.

Opelousas massacre
In the aftermath of the ratification of Louisiana's Constitution of 1868 and the Fourteenth Amendment to the United States Constitution, tensions between white Democrats and Black Republicans in St. Landry Parish escalated throughout the summer of 1868. On September 28, white schoolteacher and Republican newspaper editor Emerson Bentley was attacked and beaten by three white supremacists while teaching a classroom of Black children in Opelousas, Louisiana. Rumors of Bentley's death, while unfounded, led both Black Republicans and white supremacist Democrats, including the St. Landry Parish chapter of the Knights of the White Camelia, to threaten violent retribution. In the days following Bentley's subsequent covert flight to New Orleans, the massacre began. Heavily outnumbered, Black citizens were chased, captured, shot, murdered, and lynched during the following weeks. While estimates of casualties vary widely, several sources number the deaths between 200 and 300 black people and several dozen whites, making it the bloodiest massacres of the Reconstruction Era and among the deadliest in American history. Following the massacre, the Republican Party in St. Landry Parish was eliminated for several years.

2019 black church fires
During 10 days, three black churches, the St. Mary Baptist Church over 100 years old (26 March 2019), Greater Union Baptist Church (2 April 2019), and Mount Pleasant Baptist Church (4 April 2019) set on fire by a vandal and this incident raised officials concern that the fires started by racist and radical group or person. Finally, police arrested the vandal who was the son of a St. Landry Parish sheriff's deputy. Holden Matthews, 21, has been charged with the arson attack on black churches.

Geography

Adjacent parishes
 Avoyelles Parish  (north)
 Pointe Coupee Parish  (east)
 St. Martin Parish  (southeast)
 Lafayette Parish  (south)
 Acadia Parish  (southwest)
 Evangeline Parish  (northwest)

National protected areas
 Atchafalaya National Wildlife Refuge (part)
 Jean Lafitte National Historical Park and Preserve (part, in Eunice)

Major highways

  Interstate 49
  U.S. Highway 71
  U.S. Highway 167
  U.S. Highway 190
  Louisiana Highway 10
  Louisiana Highway 29
  Louisiana Highway 31
  Louisiana Highway 35
  Louisiana Highway 93
  Louisiana Highway 103
  Louisiana Highway 182

Demographics

2020 census

As of the 2020 United States census, there were 82,540 people, 30,441 households, and 20,790 families residing in the parish.

2010 census
As of the 2010 United States Census, there were 83,384 people living in the parish. 55.9% were White, 41.3% Black or African American, 0.4% Asian, 0.3% Native American, 0.8% of some other race and 1.3% of two or more races. 1.6% were Hispanic or Latino (of any race)

2000 census
As of the census of 2000, there were 87,700 people, 32,328 households, and 23,211 families living in the parish.  The population density was 94 people per square mile (36/km2).  There were 36,216 housing units at an average density of 39 per square mile (15/km2).  The racial makeup of the parish was 56.51% White, 42.13% Black or African American, 0.14% Native American, 0.20% Asian, 0.01% Pacific Islander, 0.31% from other races, and 0.70% from two or more races.  0.91% of the population were Hispanic or Latino of any race. 16.7% reported speaking French or Cajun French at home.

There were 32,328 households, out of which 36.10% had children under the age of 18 living with them, 49.30% were married couples living together, 17.90% had a female householder with no husband present, and 28.20% were non-families. 25.40% of all households were made up of individuals, and 11.40% had someone living alone who was 65 years of age or older.  The average household size was 2.67 and the average family size was 3.21.

In the parish the population was spread out, with 29.50% under the age of 18, 9.20% from 18 to 24, 26.50% from 25 to 44, 21.40% from 45 to 64, and 13.40% who were 65 years of age or older.  The median age was 35 years. For every 100 females there were 91.60 males.  For every 100 females age 18 and over, there were 86.80 males.

The median income for a household in the parish was $22,855, and the median income for a family was $28,908. Males had a median income of $29,458 versus $18,473 for females. The per capita income for the parish was $12,042.  About 24.70% of families and 29.30% of the population were below the poverty line, including 37.70% of those under age 18 and 27.50% of those age 65 or over.

Law enforcement

The St. Landry Parish Sheriff's Office (SLPSO) is the primary law enforcement agency of St. Landry Parish. It falls under the authority of the Sheriff, who is the chief law enforcement officer of the parish.  the sheriff of St. Landry Parish is Bobby J. Guidroz.

The office briefly became the subject of national attention in 2015 when its eccentric Crime Stoppers videos, starring public relations officer (later U.S. Representative) Clay Higgins, went viral and were featured on The Tonight Show Starring Jimmy Fallon. Higgins left the department after the videos attracted criticism from the ACLU and Sheriff Guidroz ordered that future videos be "toned down".

Politics

Education
St. Landry Parish is served by the St. Landry Parish School Board

 Arnaudville Elementary (Grades 5-8)
 Beau Chene High School (Grades 9-12) (unincorporated Arnaudville)
 Cankton Elementary (Grades PK-4) (Cankton)
 Central Middle School (Grades 5-6)
 East Elementary (Grades PK-4)
 Eunice Elementary (Grades PK-4)
 Eunice High School (Grades 9-12)
 Eunice Jr. High School (Grades 7-8)
 Glendale Elementary (Grades PK-4)
 Grand Coteau Elementary (Grades PK-4) (Grand Coteau)
 Grand Prairie Elementary (Grades PK-4) (unincorporated Washington)
 Grolee Elementary (Grades PK-4)
 Highland Elementary (Grades PK-4)
 Krotz Springs Elementary (Grades PK-8)
 Lawtell Elementary (Grades PK-8) (Lawtell)
 Leonville Elementary (Grades PK-8)
 North Central High School (Grades 9-12) (unincorporated Washington)
 Northeast Elementary (Grades PK-6)
 Northwest High School (Grades 9-12) (unincorporated Opelousas)
 Opelousas Jr. High School (Grades 7-8)
 Opelousas Sr. High School (Grades 9-12)
 Palmetto Elementary (Grades PK-4) (Palmetto)
 Park Vista Elementary (Grades PK-6)
 Plaisance Elementary (Grades 5-8) (unincorporated Opelousas)
 Port Barre Elementary (Grades PK-4)
 Port Barre High School (Grades 5-12)
 South Street Elementary (Grades PK-6)
 Sunset Elementary (Grades 5-8)
 Washington Elementary (Grades PK-8)

St. Landry Parish is also served by the Diocese of Lafayette with five schools:

 Academy of the Sacred Heart (Grades PK-12) (Grand Coteau)
 Berchman's Academy of the Sacred Heart (Grades PK-12) (Grand Coteau)
 Opelousas Catholic School (Grades PK-12) (Opelousas)
 St. Edmunds Catholic School (Grades PK-12) (Eunice)
 St. Ignatius Catholic School (Grades PK-8) (Grand Coteau)

Additionally, St. Landry Parish is served by four unaffiliated private schools:
 Good Shephard Montessori School (Grades PK-8) (Port Barre)
 Melville Private School (Grades PK-7) (Melville)
 Opelousas Family Worship School (Grades PK-12) (Opelousas)
 Westminster Christian Academy (Grades PK-12)

St. Landry Parish is served by two institutions of higher education:
 Louisiana State University at Eunice 
 South Louisiana Community College service area, T. H. Harris Campus (Opelousas)

Communities

Cities 
 Eunice
 Opelousas (parish seat and largest municipality)

Towns

 Arnaudville
 Grand Coteau
 Krotz Springs
 Leonville
 Melville
 Port Barre
 Sunset
 Washington

Villages
 Cankton
 Palmetto

Unincorporated areas

Census-designated place 

 Lawtell

Other unincorporated communities 

 LeBeau
 Lemoyen
 Morrow
 Plaisance

Notable people

 Lottie Beebe
 Rod Bernard
 Gerald Boudreaux
 Armand Brinkhaus
 Lonnie Brooks
 Tony Chachere
 Clifton Chenier
 Cat Doucet
 Gilbert L. Dupré
 E. D. Estilette
 Gregory L. Fruge
 Gordon (slave)
 Curtis J. Guillory
 Elbert Guillory
 Mickey Guillory
 T. H. Harris
 Clay Higgins
 Curtis Joubert
 Bernard LeBas
 Mildred Methvin
 Rodney Milburn
 Felix Octave Pavy
 Paul Prudhomme
 Dale Sittig
 Devery Henderson
 Herman Fuselier

See also

 National Register of Historic Places listings in St. Landry Parish, Louisiana
 Louisiana black church fires

References

Resources
 , .
 
 The author is one of the descendants of "Alexandre of Attakapas", Nezat Alexandre, born 1781 in Attakapas Post and died 1824 (Source Hebert).

External links

 Official Web Site of St. Landry Parish Government
 Website for St. Landry Catholic Church Parish
 St. Landry Parish Sheriff's Office
 St. Landry Parish Tourist Commission

Geology
 Heinrich, P. V., and W. J. Autin, 2000, Baton Rouge 30 x 60 minute geologic quadrangle. Louisiana Geological Survey, Baton Rouge, Louisiana.
 Heinrich, P. V., J. Snead, and R. P. McCulloh, 2003, Crowley 30 x 60 minute geologic quadrangle. Louisiana Geological Survey, Baton Rouge, Louisiana.
 Snead, J., P. V. Heinrich, and R. P. McCulloh, 2002, Ville Platte 30 x 60 minute geologic quadrangle. Louisiana Geological Survey, Baton Rouge, Louisiana.

 
Saint Landry Parish, Louisiana
Parishes in Acadiana
Saint Landry Parish, Louisiana
1807 establishments in the Territory of Orleans
Populated places established in 1807